Achaea imperatrix is a species of moth of the family Erebidae. It is found on Madagascar.

It has a wingspan of 76 mm.

Publication
This species was first described in Max Saalmüller in 1881.

References

Achaea (moth)
Moths described in 1881
Moths of Madagascar
Erebid moths of Africa